Anthracomyza is a genus of flies tentatively assigned to the family Polleniidae.

Species
Anthracomyza atratula (Malloch, 1927)

References

Polleniidae
Oestroidea genera
Diptera of Australasia